Victor Martin Le Roy (22 May 1842 - 4 April 1918) was a French magistrate at the Court of Auditors, art patron, and art collector. He was one of the founders and directors of the Société des amis du Louvre.

Bibliography
Catalogue raisonné de la collection Martin Le Roy, publié sous la direction de Jean-Jacques Marquet de Vasselot, Paris, 1906-1909 - 5 volumes.
Raymond Koechlin, V. Martin Le Roy. Notice lue à l'assemblée générale annuelle de la Société des Amis du Louvre, le 24 mars 1930, 1930

External links
 https://commons.wikimedia.org/wiki/Category:Martin_Le_Roy_Collection

French art collectors
1842 births
1918 deaths